Zinn Bertram Beck (September 30, 1885 – March 19, 1981) was an American professional baseball player and manager. A third baseman, shortstop and first baseman, Beck played in Major League Baseball for the St. Louis Cardinals and New York Yankees. He became a minor league manager and scout.

Playing career
In 290 career MLB games, he had a .226 batting average with 204 hits in 902 at-bats. He batted and threw right-handed. In 1919, Beck played for the Vernon Tigers, who won the Pacific Coast League championship.

Minor League managerial career
From 1920 to 1922 Beck managed the Columbia Comers in Columbia, South Carolina, winning the South Atlantic League pennant the first two years. From 1923 to 1925 Beck managed the Greenville Spinners in Greenville, South Carolina also in the South Atlantic League. In 1927 he managed the Portsmouth Truckers in Portsmouth, Virginia, winning the Virginia League pennant, and in 1928 managed the Norfolk Tars in Norfolk, Virginia until the Virginia League disbanded in June. He managed the Selma Cloverleafs in Selma, Alabama for the last part of the 1928 season, returning for full seasons in 1929 and 1930, winning the Southeastern League pennant that year. In 1934 he managed the Washington Senators farm team the Chattanooga Lookouts before being replaced by Mule Shirley.

Later life
Zinn Beck Field at Sanford Memorial Stadium in Sanford, Florida is named in his honor. In 1978, he was presented with the King of Baseball award given by Minor League Baseball. Beck died in West Palm Beach, Florida.

References

External links

King of Baseball award
Interview with Zinn Beck conducted by Eugene Murdock on December 31, 1979, in Sanford, Florida

1885 births
1981 deaths
Baseball players from Ohio
Chattanooga Lookouts managers
Columbia Comers players
Columbia Commies players
Columbia Gamecocks players
Greenville Spinners players
Major League Baseball third basemen
Minnesota Twins scouts
New York Yankees players
Portsmouth Truckers players
St. Louis Cardinals players
Sportspeople from Steubenville, Ohio
Vernon Tigers players
Waco Navigators players
Washington Senators (1901–60) scouts